Red Sun Cycling Team (UCI Code: RSC) was a women's professional cycling team based in Netherlands, sponsored by Red Sun Gardening Products.  The team registered as a UCI trade team for the first time in 2009, but disbanded the following year. Riders for Team RSC competed in the UCI Women's Road World Cup and other élite women's events throughout the world.

Team roster
2009

  Anne Arnouts
  Latoya Brulee
  Paulina Brzeźna
  Petra Dijkman
  Maxime Groenewegen
  Elise van Hage
  Ludivine Henrion
  Emma Johansson
  Inge Klep
  Daniëlla Moonen
  Mascha Pijnenborg
  Moniek Rotmensen
  Laure Werner

Major wins

2009
Roux Miroir, Ludivine Henrion
Oostduinkerke, Emma Johansson
Ronde van Drenthe, Emma Johansson
Rijsoord, Latoya Brulee
Heusden-Zolder Chrono, Latoya Brulee
Stage 5 Thüringen Rundfahrt der Frauen, Emma Johansson
Stage 6 Holland Ladies Tour, Emma Johansson
2010
Omloop Het Nieuwsblad, Emma Johansson
Provincial Road Race Championship Oost-Vlaanderen, Latoya Brulee
Provincial Time Trial Championship Vlaams-Brabant, Laure Werner
Mamer, Emma Johansson
Stage 1 Thüringen Rundfahrt der Frauen, Emma Johansson
Overall Trophée d'Or Féminin, Emma Johansson
Stage 4 Trophée d'Or Féminin, Emma Johansson

National champions
2009
 Belgian National Road Race Championships, Ludivine Henrion

External links
 Red Sun Cycling Team

Cycling teams based in the Netherlands
UCI Women's Teams
Cycling teams established in 2009
Cycling teams disestablished in 2010